Diogo Cayolla (born 6 August 1974) is a Portuguese sailor. He competed at the 1996 Summer Olympics, the 2000 Summer Olympics, and the 2004 Summer Olympics.

References

External links
 

1974 births
Living people
Portuguese male sailors (sport)
Olympic sailors of Portugal
Sailors at the 1996 Summer Olympics – Star
Sailors at the 2000 Summer Olympics – 49er
Sailors at the 2004 Summer Olympics – Tornado
Place of birth missing (living people)